The 2017–18 Iraq Division One. Al-Karkh and Erbil secured the two promotion spots for the 2018–19 Iraqi Premier League, with Al-Karkh being the champions due to having more points than Erbil in the final stage. The final round started on 8 August 2018 and finished on 20 August 2018.

Format
Teams from all over Iraq participated in preliminary qualifications for the final stage, which consisted of 12 teams split into two groups. The winners of the two groups would be promoted.

Final stage

Group 1
All matches played in Erbil.

Results

Group 2
All matches played in Karkh.

Results

Others
 2017–18 Iraqi Premier League
 2017 Iraqi Super Cup

References

External links
 Iraq Football Association

Iraq Division One seasons
Division One